Adaro was a Spanish aircraft manufacturer founded by engineer Julio Adaro to manufacture training aircraft for the Spanish Air Force prior to the Civil War.

List of Aircraft
Adaro Chirta  (1935) Single-engine two-seat biplane training aircraft

Defunct aircraft manufacturers of Spain

References